In mathematics, the Markov spectrum devised by Andrey Markov is a complicated set of real numbers arising in Markov Diophantine equation and also in the theory of Diophantine approximation.

Quadratic form characterization 
Consider a quadratic form given by f(x,y) = ax2 + bxy + cy2  and suppose that its discriminant is fixed, say equal to −1/4. In other words, b2 − 4ac = 1.

One can ask for the minimal value achieved by  when it is evaluated at non-zero vectors of the grid  , and if this minimum does not exist, for the infimum.

The Markov spectrum M is the set obtained by repeating this search with different quadratic forms with discriminant fixed to −1/4:

Lagrange spectrum

Starting from Hurwitz's theorem on Diophantine approximation, that any real number  has a sequence of rational approximations m/n tending to it with

for such a sequence, for which c is the best possible (maximal) value. Such 1/c make up the Lagrange spectrum L, a set of real numbers at least  (which is the smallest value of the spectrum). The formulation with the reciprocal is awkward, but the traditional definition invites it; looking at the set of c instead allows a definition instead by means of an inferior limit. For that, consider

where m is chosen as an integer function of n to make the difference minimal.

Relation with Markov spectrum 
The initial part of the Lagrange spectrum, namely the part lying in the interval , is equal to the Markov spectrum.

  .

Real numbers greater than F are also members of the Markov spectrum.  Moreover, it is possible to prove that L is strictly contained in M.

Geometry of Markov and Lagrange spectrum 
On one hand, the initial part of the Markov and Lagrange spectrum lying in the interval [, 3) are both equal and they are a discrete set. On the other hand, the final part of these sets lying after Freiman's constant are also equal, but a continuous set. The geometry of the part between the initial part and final part has a fractal structure, and can be seen as a geometric transition between the discrete initial part and the continuous final part. This is stated precisely in the next theorem:

See also
Markov number

References

Further reading
 
Conway, J. H. and Guy, R. K. The Book of Numbers. New York: Springer-Verlag, pp. 188–189, 1996.
Cusick, T. W. and Flahive, M. E. The Markov and Lagrange Spectra. Providence, RI: Amer. Math. Soc., 1989.

External links

Diophantine approximation
Quadratic forms
Combinatorics